Luis Stefani Raffucci was a long time Chancellor of the University of Puerto Rico at Mayagüez.

He was born in Mayagüez, Puerto Rico.  His father was a Corsican immigrant.

Raffucci studied engineering at the Massachusetts Institute of Technology.  He was a member of the Phi Sigma Alpha fraternity.

The faculties of Agriculture, Engineering and Science were created under his direction.

Legacy
The General Engineering building at the University of Puerto Rico at Mayagüez bears his name.  The most important award that the University of Puerto Rico at Mayagüez gives to any graduate is the Luis Stefani Award.  A street in the Hostos neighborhood in Mayagüez is named in his honor.

See also

University of Puerto Rico at Mayaguez people

References

 
MIT School of Engineering alumni
University of Puerto Rico at Mayagüez
People from Mayagüez, Puerto Rico